Dubno Raion is a raion in Rivne Oblast in western Ukraine. Its administrative center is located in Dubno. Population: 

On 18 July 2020, as part of the administrative reform of Ukraine, the number of raions of Rivne Oblast was reduced to four, and the area of Dubno Raion was significantly expanded.  The January 2020 estimate of the raion population was 

The raion includes the urban-type settlement of Smyha and 23 rural municipalities consisting of 103 villages.

See also
 Subdivisions of Ukraine

References

External links
 rv.gov.ua 

Raions of Rivne Oblast
1939 establishments in Ukraine